Ma Fuxing (Ma Fu-hsing in Wade Giles; 1864–1924) was a Hui born in Yunnan, in Qing dynasty China. He was an ex-convict. During Yang Zengxin's reign in Xinjiang, Ma was appointed as a military commander, and then Titai of Kashgar.

Ma Fuxing served as a general for the Qing dynasty. He joined the Kansu Braves during the Boxer Rebellion, under the command of Gen. Ma Fulu and fought against the foreign forces during the Siege of the International Legations (Boxer Rebellion) and Battle of Peking.

After the fall of the Qing dynasty he started working for Yang Zengxin and recruited Dungan troops for him in 1911, and was posted in 1916 to Kashgar. In 1924 Yang intercepted some correspondence between Ma and the Zhili clique and became suspicious.

Ma Fuxing was appointed as the commander of 2,000 Hui soldiers by Yang Zengxin.

Reign
 His reign was notorious for its repressiveness and his excesses. He kept a harem of Uighur wives, and a hay cutting machine for severing the limbs of his victims. The limbs were put on display, along with notices on why they were severed, on the city walls. He also established government monopolies over industries such as petroleum, and made people purchase paraffin wax. In addition, he demanded that people call him padishah (meaning 'King').

Downfall

Yang Zengxin decided that Ma's excesses were too great, and sent Ma Shaowu, another Hui military commander, to attack and replace him. 
Ma Shaowu attacked Ma Fuxing, and then personally executed him by shooting him after receiving a telegram from Yang Zengxin. Ma Fuxing's body was tied to a cross to be put on display. Ma Shaowu then was appointed Daotai of Kashgar.

See also
 Xinjiang clique
 Ma clique
 Yang Zengxin
 Ma Shaowu
 Kashgar

References

External links

1854 births
1924 deaths
Republic of China warlords from Yunnan
Hui people
Chinese Muslim generals